Sophia Louise Little (1799–1893) was an American poet and abolitionist.

Life 
Sophia Louise Robbins was born in Newport, Rhode Island, on August 22, 1799. She was the second daughter of Asher Robbins, a United States Senator from Rhode Island. She was educated in her native town, and in 1834 married William Little, Jr., of Boston, who greatly assisted her by judicious criticism in the development of her poetic talent. Her first poem of any length, a description of a New England Thanksgiving, was printed in 1838 in The Token. Sophia Little took an active interest in the anti-slavery movement, and was a life-long friend of William Lloyd Garrison, being present at the Boston meeting, at which he was mobbed. She was also president of the Prisoner's Aid Association of Rhode Island from its formation. With the aid of friends, she opened a free reading room for working people in Newport, which proved to be the germ of a free public library. She also established a Holly-tree coffee-house, and was still active in many charitable enterprises in 1887.

Little died in 1893. Her son, Robbins Little, became a lawyer and librarian.

Works 
Little, besides contributing frequently to various periodicals, published the following poems: "The Last Days of Jesus " (Boston, 1839); "The Annunciation and Birth of Jesus, and the Resurrection" (1843); and "Pentecost" (1873). In 1877 a complete edition of her religious poems was published at Newport, bearing the title, Last Days of Jesus, and Other Poems.

Notes

References

Sources 
 Ockerbloom, John Mark, ed. "Little, Sophia L. (Sophia Louisa), 1799-". The Online Books Page. Retrieved September 7, 2022.
 Van Broekhoven, Deborah Bingham (2000). "Little, Sophia Louisa Robbins (1799-1893), writer and reformer". American National Biography. Oxford University Press. Retrieved August 20, 2022.

Attribution:

1799 births
1893 deaths
19th-century American women writers
American women poets
19th-century American poets
Writers from Newport, Rhode Island
Poets from Rhode Island
American abolitionists
Activists from Rhode Island